Kalpetta State assembly constituency is one of the 140 state legislative assembly constituencies in Kerala state in southern India.  It is also one of the 7 state legislative assembly constituencies included in the Wayanad Lok Sabha constituency.
 As of the 2021 Kerala Legislative Assembly election, the current MLA is T Siddique of Indian National Congress.

Local self governed segments
Kalpetta Niyamasabha constituency is composed of the following local self governed segments:

Members of Legislative Assembly
The following list contains all members of Kerala legislative assembly who have represented the constituency:

Key

Election results

Niyamasabha Election 2021

Niyamasabha Election 2016 
There were 1,90,938 registered voters in the constituency for the 2016 election.

Niyamasabha Election 2011 
There were 1,70,245 registered voters in the constituency for the 2011 election.

See also
 Kalpetta
 Wayanad district
 List of constituencies of the Kerala Legislative Assembly
 2016 Kerala Legislative Assembly election

References 

Assembly constituencies of Kerala
State assembly constituencies in Wayanad district